Jostein Hasselgård (born 24 March 1979) is a Norwegian singer. He was the winner of Norway's national pre-selection for the Eurovision Song Contest and he won Norway a fourth place in the finals of the Eurovision Song Contest 2003 with the ballad "I'm Not Afraid To Move On".

He started to play the piano when he was six years old and has trained in several musical genres. Following his achievement in 2003 Hasselgård sang at various concerts in the southeastern part of Norway. His home page indicates that his career as an entertainment artist has been uneventful since 2004.

He has studied at the Norwegian Academy of Music in Oslo to focus and also worked full-time as a kindergarten teacher.

In 2006, Jostein and his band Hasselgård, released an album called A few Words.

He has been a tenor for the vocal group Pust since 2006, and had his last performance with the group December 15th 2022.

References

External links
 Hasselgård band

1979 births
Living people
Eurovision Song Contest entrants for Norway
Eurovision Song Contest entrants of 2003
Melodi Grand Prix contestants
Musicians from Fredrikstad
Melodi Grand Prix winners
English-language singers from Norway
Norwegian educators
Norwegian male pianists
21st-century Norwegian singers
21st-century pianists
21st-century Norwegian male singers